PRG can mean: 
Parti radical de gauche (Radical Party of the Left), France
Paul Roos Gymnasium, school in Stellenbosch, South Africa
Post/Redirect/Get, in web applications
 prg, ISO 639-3 language code for the Old Prussian language
 Prague Václav Havel Airport, IATA code
Programming Research Group, Oxford University 1965-2011
Provisional Revolutionary Government of the Republic of South Vietnam, Viet Cong party
People's Revolutionary Government (Grenada)
Pseudorandom generator, of deterministic but pseudorandom numbers
.prg is a file format used for Commodore 64 software